Ballz is an endless round mobile game published by Ketchapp. It is available on iOS and Android.

Gameplay
In the start of the game, a player is introduced with a single ball at the bottom of the screen and square blocks with associated numbers near the top of the screen. Then the player can use their finger to pull back and release the ball(s) at a desired angle to hit the squares progressively lowering the number until they are gone. Additionally, there are small white circles spread throughout the screen that can be hit increasing the amount of balls available to the user. If the user fails to destroy the squares before they reach the bottom the game is ended.

The highest score on the game is up to debate due to under reporting. Ketchapp's official Twitter page began a thread in 2017 on this topic, the highest on that particular thread is displayed to be 6,501

Reception
In March 2017, Ballz was the number 1 game in the Apple App Store.

References

2020 video games
Action video games
Android (operating system) games
IOS games
Video games developed in France
Single-player video games